The China shock (or China trade shock) is the impact of rising Chinese exports on manufacturing employment in the United States and Europe after China's accession to the World Trade Organization in 2001. Studies have estimated that the China trade shock reduced U.S. manufacturing employment by 0.55 million (explaining about 16% of the total decline in manufacturing employment in the U.S. between 2000 and 2007), 1.8-2.0 million, and 2.0-2.4 million. Losses in manufacturing employment have also been observed in Norway, Spain, and Germany. Studies have shown that there was "higher unemployment, lower labor force participation, and reduced wages in local labor markets" in U.S. regions that have industries that competed with Chinese industries. Studies have shown that while some markets in the United States suffered adverse welfare and labor impacts, American trade led to net gains in employment and welfare over the period 1991-2011. These claims have been disputed by Economists David Autor, David Dorn and Gordon Hanson, who state that "at the national
level, employment has fallen in the US industries more exposed to import
competition, as expected, but offsetting employment gains in other industries have yet to materialize." A 2017 study found that Germany gained on net from trade.

Experts have argued that the China trade shock in relation to consumer goods largely ended by 2006 while indicating that for capital goods the effects of Chinese imports to the United States continued up until 2012 and are ongoing in specific product categories. Economists David Autor, David Dorn and Gordon H. Hanson, who have extensively studied U.S. labor markets adjustments to trade competition shocks caused by China, supported the Trans-Pacific Partnership. Autor, Dorn and Hanson argue the adoption of the TPP "would promote trade in knowledge-intensive services in which U.S. companies exert a strong comparative advantage" and pressure China to raise regulatory rules and standards to those of TPP members, while "killing the TPP would do little" to bring manufacturing back to the United States.

Background 
In 1991, China only accounted for 1% of total imports to the United States. Innovations in communications and transportation technology in the 1990s made it easier for firms to offshore production to low-wage countries such as China. China's accession to the WTO meant that it had to liberalize its economy, and reduce state interference, which boosted the efficiency of Chinese exporters. As China already had "most-favored nation" (MFN) status since the 1980s in Europe and the United States, WTO accession did not lead to lower trade barriers. However, China's MFN status had been subject to annual approval by Congress in the United States; research has suggested that this caused uncertainty, and discouraged China-U.S. trade.

Political impact 
Studies have linked the effects of the China shock to an increase in populism and a backlash against globalization. Studies have shown that British regions that were more exposed to Chinese import competition were more likely to vote for Brexit in the 2016 referendum. Exposure to the China shock has led to negative views of minorities, in particular among American whites and males.

Papers have found that the China shock has contributed to political polarization. One analysis also found that it contributed to Donald Trump's victory in the 2016 presidential election: "A counterfactual study of closely contested states suggests that Michigan, Wisconsin, and Pennsylvania would have elected the Democrat instead of the Republican candidate if, ceteris paribus, the growth in Chinese import penetration had been 50 percent lower than the actual growth during the period of analysis. The Democrat candidate would also have obtained a majority in the electoral college in this counterfactual scenario."

In Italy, surges in support for the Lega Nord in the 2010s have been observed in localities where textile mills were undercut by Chinese manufacturers.

Social impact
A 2016 study found that exposure to Chinese import competition led to greater high school graduation rates in the United States. This is possibly because of lower wages and employment opportunities for individuals without high school degrees in regions that competed with China. Economist Samuel Hammond, the director of poverty and welfare policy for the Niskanen Center, has argued that the signing into law of Permanent Normal Trade Relations (PNTR) with China on October 10, 2000 and the subsequent accession of China to the WTO has had wide reaching social implications. He states that the "PNTR has been implicated in some of the most significant and distressing trends of American life in this century: millions of well-paying manufacturing jobs lost; declining family formation and rising deaths of despair; soaring real-estate prices and medieval levels of urban inequality; increased political polarization and populist movements, left and right; and faltering faith in the power of liberal democracy to respond to these and related challenges. To pin all this on a single trade agreement would be a step too far, of course. And yet the imprint of what's come to be known as the "China shock" can be seen on all these trends, either through its first-order effects, or its reverberations through the body politic."

According to two studies, trade-related job losses contribute to greater military enlistment in the United States.

See also

 China and the World Trade Organization

References

Foreign trade of China
World Trade Organization